Jonas Nietfeld (born 15 January 1994) is a German professional footballer who plays as a forward for Hallescher FC.

Career
Nietfeld played as a youth for Hannover 96 before joining Rot-Weiss Erfurt in 2011. He made his debut for the club in August 2010, as a substitute for Tom Bertram in a 3–0 defeat to Hallescher FC.

In August 2014, some weeks after the start of the season, Nietfeld left Erfurt and signed for Schalke 04's reserve team on a one-year deal. Although Erfurt secured themselves a clause to retract him if required.

In the 2017 summer transfer window, Nietfeld joined SSV Jahn Regensburg which were newly promoted to the 2. Bundesliga. After two years in Regensburg, he joined Hallescher FC.

References

External links
 
 
 

1994 births
Living people
Association football forwards
German footballers
Hannover 96 players
FC Rot-Weiß Erfurt players
FC Schalke 04 II players
FSV Zwickau players
SSV Jahn Regensburg players
Hallescher FC players
2. Bundesliga players
3. Liga players
Regionalliga players
People from Minden
Sportspeople from Detmold (region)
Footballers from North Rhine-Westphalia